Waynflete School is a private, coeducational, college preparatory day school established in 1898 for early childhood education (from age 3) to twelfth grade, in Portland, Maine.

History
In 1898, Waynflete School was established by Agnes Lowell and Caroline Crisfield. During a trip to England, they became interested in statesman and educator William Waynflete, after whom the school is named. The school opened with forty-nine students, admitting small numbers of boys even from its early days. In the early twentieth century, Waynflete adopted a progressive education model emphasizing physical, social, emotional, and intellectual development through hands on learning, as championed by philosopher John Dewey. In 1950, boys past the fourth grade were admitted, and in 1967, boys were admitted into the Upper School.

Academics
Lower School provides education from early childhood (ages 3 and 4) to fifth grade, with the Middle School serving sixth through eighth grades, and Upper School serving ninth through twelfth grades. The school has approximately 550 students, with an average classroom size of 13 students, and a student to adult ratio of 9:1.

Cocurricular activities such as student government and community service are offered in Middle and Upper School.

Waynflete School won the state Science Olympiad 8 times, most recently in 2013-2019.

Accreditation
Waynflete is accredited by the New England Association of Schools and Colleges (NEASC), and is a member of the National Association of Independent Schools (NAIS), Maine Association of Independent Schools, Independent School Association of Northern New England (ISANNE), Association of Independent Schools of New England (AISNE), and Cum Laude Society.

Recognition
 Bowdoin College – Abraxas Award, 2005
 Malone Family Foundation – Malone Scholar School, 2011
 Down East Magazine – Readers' Choice Private School, 2011

Campus

Waynflete has a three-acre campus made up of historic homes modified for school use, as well as newly constructed buildings. The campus consists of eleven buildings, which include: Boulos House, Hurd House, Sills Hall, Hewes Hall, Founders Hall, Morrill House, Cook-Hyde House, Thomas House, Davis Hall, Emery Building, Upper School Science Center, LEED Silver certified Arts Center designed by Scott Simons Architects consisting of a 276-seat theater and exhibition gallery, two gymnasiums, and two school-owned housing units, one used for the residence of the Headmaster, and the other not currently used for educational purposes. Waynflete also has a thirty-five-acre off-campus scenic athletic complex named Fore River Fields.

Athletics
Lower School students participate in physical education. Middle School students participate in competitive sports or non-competitive activities. Upper School offers competitive sports at the junior varsity and varsity level, as well as, physical education options and an independent physical activity program.

Waynflete competes in the Western Maine Conference and is a member of Maine Principals' Association (MPA). The school athletic teams are called Flyers, with the school colors being green and white.

Notable alumni
 Christopher Fitzgerald (1991) – actor
 Linda Lavin, actress
 Nicole Maines (2015) - transgender activist and actress
 Judd Nelson – actor
 Michael Odokara-Okigbo (2008) – member of the Dartmouth Aires
 Jane Spencer (1994) – writer
 Liv Tyler (transferred out) – actress

References

External links

Educational institutions established in 1898
Education in Portland, Maine
Schools in Portland, Maine
Education in Cumberland County, Maine
Schools in Cumberland County, Maine
Preparatory schools in Maine
Private elementary schools in Maine
Private middle schools in Maine
Private high schools in Maine
1898 establishments in Maine
West End (Portland, Maine)